Pull the Plug is an album by the Huntingtons, self-released by the band in 2005. It was recorded June 12–14, 2005 at Mikey's Green Room. It was mixed and messed with June 15–16, 2005, engineered by M. Holt and mastered by J. Powell at Steinhaus.

Track listing 
All songs were written by Huntingtons, except track 7 (The Beach Boys) and track 11 (The Cars).

 Aloha, It's You
 How Can I Miss You If You Won't Go Away?
 80's Girl
 Losing Penny
 Teenage Queen
 I Would Give You Anything
 Don't Worry, Baby
 I'm No Good
 Leave Home
 The Last Time That You Left
 You Might Think

Personnel
Mike Holt ("Mikey"): bass guitar, lead vocals
Cliff Powell ("Cliffy"): guitar, backing vocals
Josh Blackway ("Jonny"): guitar, backing vocals
Rick Wise: drums

The Huntingtons albums
2005 albums
Self-released albums